Molitor may refer to:

Geography
 Molitor, Wisconsin
 Michel-Ange - Molitor (Paris Métro)
 Piscine Molitor, a swimming pool complex in the 16th arrondissement of Paris, France
 Porte Molitor, one of the city gates of Paris

People
 Molitor (surname)
 André Molitor (1911-2005), Belgian senior civil servant 
 Claudia Molitor (born 1974), English-German composer
 Gabriel Jean Joseph Molitor (1770–1849), French general of the Napoleonic era
 The Molitor Stradivarius, a Stradivarius violin named for its former ownership by the general
 Ingenuin Molitor (1610–1669), German-born Franciscan priest and composer
 Katharina Molitor (born 1983), German javelin thrower
 Paul Molitor (born 1956), former professional baseball player and member of the National Baseball Hall of Fame
Valentin Molitor (1637–1713), Swiss composer and Benedictine monk

Biology
 Tenebrio molitor, a species of darkling beetle
 Hyla molitor, a species of frog
 Lundomys molitor, a species of rat